Wilhelm Pankl (25 April 1915 – 22 March 2002) was an Austrian weightlifter. He competed in the men's light-heavyweight event at the 1948 Summer Olympics.

References

1915 births
2002 deaths
Austrian male weightlifters
Olympic weightlifters of Austria
Weightlifters at the 1948 Summer Olympics
Place of birth missing
20th-century Austrian people